The Moses U. Payne House, also known as Lynn Bluffs and Roby River Bed and Breakfast, is a historic home near the Missouri River in Rocheport, Missouri.  It was constructed in 1856–1857, and is a large frame central hall plan I-house. It is five bays wide and features an ornamental ironwork front porch.

It was added to the National Register of Historic Places in 1994.

See also
Historic houses in Missouri

References

I-houses in Missouri
Houses on the National Register of Historic Places in Missouri
Houses completed in 1857
Houses in Boone County, Missouri
National Register of Historic Places in Boone County, Missouri
1857 establishments in Missouri